Garcia Point is a conspicuous point which forms the south side of the terminus of DeGanahl Glacier, where the latter enters Liv Glacier, in the Queen Maud Mountains of Antarctica. It was named by the Advisory Committee on Antarctic Names for Leopoldo Garcia, a United States Antarctic Research Program meteorologist at South Pole Station, winter 1965.

References

Headlands of the Ross Dependency
Dufek Coast